Kosmos 52 ( meaning Cosmos 52) or Zenit-2 No.26 was a Soviet, first generation, low resolution, optical film-return reconnaissance satellite launched in 1965.

Kosmos 52 was launched by a Vostok-2 rocket, serial number R15002-03, flying from Site 31/6 at the Baikonur Cosmodrome. The launch took place at 09:36 GMT on 11 January 1965, with the spacecraft receiving its Kosmos designation - along with the International Designator 1965-001A and the Satellite Catalog Number 00968 - upon its successful insertion into orbit. It was the first satellite to be launched in the year 1965.

Kosmos 52 was operated in a low Earth orbit. On 19 January 1965, eight days after launch, Kosmos 52 was deorbited so that its return capsule could be recovered by Soviet forces and its photos developed and analysed.

References

Kosmos satellites
Spacecraft launched in 1965
Spacecraft which reentered in 1965
Zenit-2 satellites